Ipomopsis longiflora, common name flaxflowered gilia or flaxflowered ipomopsis, is a plant. The Zuni people use the dried, powdered flowers and water of I. longiflora subsp. longiflora to create a poultice to remove hair on newborns and children.

Gallery of photos

References

longiflora
Flora of the Southwestern United States
Plants used in traditional Native American medicine
Plants described in 1828